Antonio Ivančić (born 25 May 1995) is a Croatian footballer, who plays for Zrinjski Mostar.

Career statistics

References

1995 births
Living people
Footballers from Zagreb
Croatian footballers
Croatian Football League players
First Football League (Croatia) players
NK Istra 1961 players
NK Rudeš players
HŠK Zrinjski Mostar players
Association football midfielders